Cheng San Group Representation Constituency (Simplified Chinese: 静山集选区;Traditional Chinese: 靜山集選區) was a Group Representation Constituency (GRC) in the North-eastern region in Singapore. The GRC consisted of the eastern part of Ang Mo Kio, Jalan Kayu, Seletar Hills, part of Serangoon North, a large part of Hougang, Buangkok, and the whole of Sengkang New Town and Punggol New Town.

History

The GRC was formed in 1988, and absorbed the constituencies of Cheng San, Chong Boon and Jalan Kayu. In the 1991 general election, the constituency was enlarged to include the former Punggol ward. For the general election in 1997, parts of the Chong Boon division of the GRC, bounded by Ang Mo Kio Avenue 10, Ang Mo Kio Avenue 3, Central Expressway and Ang Mo Kio Avenue 1, were transferred to Ang Mo Kio GRC. The GRC was an opposition favourite in the 1991 election, and was hotly contested in the 1997 general election between People's Action Party and Workers' Party. The Punggol district were split into 3 wards which are Punggol Central, Punggol East and Punggol South as a result of the growing population of Hougang to suppress the population of Sengkang and Punggol since 1999 and it necessitated the redrawing boundaries. After a hotly contested election in 1997, the GRC was split and subsumed into three GRCs in 2001 general election. The GRCs which absorbed Cheng San GRC were Ang Mo Kio GRC, Pasir Ris–Punggol GRC and Aljunied GRC due to redrawing of electoral districts by the Elections Department.

Due to the unclear separation of power between the Prime Minister's Office and the Elections Department, the Opposition has often criticised the absorption of Cheng San GRC as gerrymandering on the part of the ruling party.

1997 general election 
Cheng San GRC became the hotspot constituency during the 1997 General Elections. The People's Action Party team led by the then-Minister for Education Lee Yock Suan, faced the contest by a Workers' Party team led by the then-Secretary-General and former opposition Member of Parliament, Joshua Benjamin Jeyaretnam, and Tang Liang Hong, a senior lawyer.

Having been automatically 're-elected' due to walkovers in their own constituencies, then-Prime Minister of Singapore Goh Chok Tong and his two deputies from the People's Action Party (PAP) campaigned on behalf for the PAP's candidates in the Cheng San GRC. Goh described himself as "a special candidate" of the constituency and declared that his credibility and reputation as Prime Minister were at stake in the contest. The PAP campaign took on a two-pronged focus. Firstly, the PAP accused Tang of being anti-Christian and a Chinese chauvinist, labelling him a "dangerous man". Secondly, the Prime Minister told Cheng San voters that if they returned PAP candidates to power in the election, they would get a host of benefits. These included access to better transport facilities such as the MRT and LRT, new housing projects, such as Punggol 21, and opportunities to upgrade their HDB apartments and public housing estates. The PAP emphasised that constituencies that failed to return PAP candidates to power would not receive priority in government upgrading programmes and might end up becoming slums.

The Workers' Party's rallies in Cheng San GRC attracted huge crowds. On the eve of Polling Day, 50,000 people attended the Workers' Party rally at Yio Chu Kang Stadium. However, the news coverage of this astounding turnout was disproportionately understated, causing much online criticism of the Straits Times in reporting objectively.

On Polling Day, several former PAP ministers, including Goh Chok Tong, Tony Tan and Lee Hsien Loong were within the precinct of polling stations in Cheng San GRC, although they were not themselves candidates in the constituency. The Workers Party believed that this violated the Parliamentary Elections Act,  as unauthorised personnel are prohibited from polling stations by election law to prevent undue influence and harassment on voters and staff. The Workers' Party's candidates filed police reports, citing the violation of two sections of the Parliamentary Elections Act:
 Section 82(1)(d): "No person shall wait outside any polling station on polling day, except for the purpose of gaining entry to the polling station to cast his vote".
 Section 82(1)(e): "No person shall loiter in any street or public place within a radius of 200 metres of any polling station on polling day."
Their complaints were not prosecuted by the police, on the advice of the Attorney-General Chan Sek Keong. The Attorney-General, in his letter to the Minister of Law, interpreted the statute as being irrelevant to people within the polling station, and that remaining within the polling station itself, as opposed to being within a perimeter of 200 meters from the external walls of the polling station, was not an offence. He added that "the possibility of a person inside a polling station influencing or intimidating voters in the presence of the presiding officer and his officials, the polling agents etc was considered so remote that it was discounted by the Act."

The WP then questioned if the AG was suggesting that it was acceptable for people to enter and loiter on the grounds of the polling station instead of outside the station. Later, the Workers' Party renewed its call for a multi-party Election Commission to ensure fair play in the conduct of Parliamentary elections.

WP lost in Cheng San GRC, obtaining 44,132 votes, which was 45.2% of the valid votes in the constituency of approximately 98,000 voters. Cheng San GRC ceased to exist in the next election and thus was redrawn into several neighbouring constituencies.

Members of Parliament

Electoral results

Elections in 1980s

Elections in 1990s

References

1988 General Election's Result
1991 General Election's Result
1997 General Election's Result
Results for 1997 General Election in Cheng San GRC which was its last appearance

See also 
Cheng San SMC
Eunos Group Representation Constituency

Singaporean electoral divisions
Ang Mo Kio
Hougang
Punggol
Sengkang